Marianne Cerilli (born 1961) is a politician in Manitoba, Canada.  She served as a New Democratic member of the Manitoba legislature from 1990 until 2003, though she was not called to cabinet when the party formed government in 1999.

Cerilli was born in Toronto, raised in Winnipeg, and was educated at the University of Manitoba (from which she holds a B.P.E. and a Bachelor of Education degree). Before entering political life, she worked as a high school athletics coach, and was a counsellor in the Winnipeg School Division.  She also worked at the Unemployed Health Centre of Winnipeg, and was a consultant to Manitoba Employment and Youth Services for three years.

Political career
Cerilli initially intended to run for the NDP in the north-end Winnipeg riding of Broadway in the 1990 provincial election, but lost the party nomination to Conrad Santos by one vote.  She instead ran in the northeast Winnipeg riding of Radisson, where she defeated Progressive Conservative candidate Mike Thompson by almost 1500 votes (incumbent Liberal Allan Patterson finished third). The Progressive Conservatives won the general election, and Cerilli joined nineteen other New Democrats in the official opposition. At the time she was the youngest woman ever elected to the Manitoba legislature.

Cerilli was re-elected in the 1995 provincial election, defeating Liberal Art Miki by 4891 votes to 2401.  The Progressive Conservatives won the general election again; during her time in opposition, Cerilli served as NDP critic for Housing, Workplace Safety, Health and Youth.  She was regarded as one of the more left-wing members of caucus, and was the only Manitoba MLA to support Svend Robinson, rather than Lorne Nystrom, for the leadership of the federal NDP in 1995.

The NDP were victorious in the 1999 provincial election, and Cerilli personally defeated Progressive Conservative Henry McDonald by 5198 votes to 3114.  She was not appointed to cabinet, but served as legislative assistant to the Minister of Family Services and Housing.  In 2003, she supported Bill Blaikie's campaign to lead the federal New Democratic Party.

Prior to the 2003 provincial election, she decided to leave her Radisson riding to run for the nomination in Wolseley. She lost to current MLA Rob Altemeyer. She now teaches part-time at the University of Winnipeg, and is operating a community development business.

On September 15, 2006, Cerilli officially registered as a candidate for Mayor of the City of Winnipeg in the 2006 municipal election, but lost to incumbent mayor Sam Katz.

Electoral record (partial)

Provincial

Municipal

References

1961 births
Living people
21st-century Canadian politicians
21st-century Canadian women politicians
New Democratic Party of Manitoba MLAs
Politicians from Toronto
Politicians from Winnipeg
Women MLAs in Manitoba